Borrows is a surname. Notable people with the surname include:

 Alison Borrows (born 1992), Australian slalom canoeist
 Brian Borrows (born 1960), English footballer
 Chester Borrows (born 1957), New Zealand politician
 Edward Borrows, founder of Edward Borrows and Sons
 Simon Borrows (born 1959), British investment banker

See also
 Borrowes, surname
 Borrow (disambiguation)